Douglas L. Allison (July 12, 1846 – December 19, 1916) was an American Major League Baseball player. He began his career as a catcher for the original Cincinnati Red Stockings, the first fully professional baseball team. Allison was one of the first catchers to stand directly behind the batter, as a means to prevent baserunners from stealing bases. He was considered a specialist, at a time when some of the better batsmen who manned the position normally rested, or substituted at other fielding positions. Allison became the earliest known player to use a type of baseball glove when he donned buckskin mittens to protect his hands in 1870.

Prior to his baseball career, Allison served as a private in Company L of the 192nd Pennsylvania Infantry Regiment during the American Civil War. His brother Art Allison also played in the Major Leagues.

Career

Cincinnati Red Stockings
Not quite 22 years old, Allison moved to Cincinnati for the 1868 season and played for the Cincinnati Red Stockings managed by Harry Wright. Open professionalism was one year away but the long move from Philadelphia, where he worked as a bricklayer, suggests that Allison was somehow compensated by club members, if not by the club. Cincinnati fielded a strong team that year, with five of the famous team already in place. Allison was a defensive specialist, whose job was simply to catch pitcher Asa Brainard. 

Most catchers of Allison's era stood twenty to twenty-five feet behind the batter. His technique of moving closer to the batter proved effective in curtailing baserunners from stealing bases. In the 1860s, it was common for teams to score fifty or sixty runs a game, but as the technique of moving closer to the batter became more widespread among other catchers, run production began to plummet, helping usher in what became known as the dead-ball era.

When the National Association of Base Ball Players (NABBP) permitted professionalism, the Red Stockings hired five incumbents including Allison and five new men to complete its roster, the first team that consisted of salaried players. A few of the others had previously played some catcher (all played at the six infield positions in 1868), but Allison filled the role in almost every game. Cincinnati toured the continent undefeated in 1869 and may have been the strongest team in 1870, but the club dropped professional base ball after the second season.

Later career
The other five regulars including Allison signed with Nick Young's Washington Olympics, an established club that also joined the new, entirely professional National Association (NA). The five former Red Stockings led the Olympics to a respectable finish in the inaugural NA season.

Later life
Allison was reported playing for a post office team in 1882.  Thirty-four years later he died in Washington, D.C., at age 70, en route to his job at the Post Office Department. He is buried in Rock Creek Cemetery, Washington.

References

Liberman, Noah (2003). Glove Affairs: The Romance, History, and Tradition of the Baseball Glove. Triumph Books. .
Wright, Marshall (2000). The National Association of Base Ball Players, 1857–1870. Jefferson, NC: McFarland & Co. .

External links

1846 births
1916 deaths
Baseball players from Philadelphia
Major League Baseball catchers
Baseball player-managers
19th-century baseball players
Philadelphia Geary players
Cincinnati Red Stockings players
Washington Olympics players
Troy Haymakers players
Brooklyn Eckfords players
Elizabeth Resolutes players
New York Mutuals players
Hartford Dark Blues players
Providence Grays players
Baltimore Orioles (NL) players
Burials at Rock Creek Cemetery
Capital City of Albany players
Rochester Hop Bitters players
Union Army soldiers